Kako Senior Secondary School is a government aided, mixed boarding middle and high school (grades 8–13) in Uganda.

Location
Kako is situated on the northeastern shores of Lake Victoria, the second-largest freshwater lake in the world. The coordinates of Kako Senior Secondary School are: 0°18'19.0"S, 31°48'26.0"E (Latitude: -0.305278; Longitude: 31.807222).

History
The school was founded in 1963 by several individuals in the Anglican Church in what was then the West Buganda Diocese. These included the following: 

The late Tomasi Ssemukasa, at the time the sub-county chief of Mukungwe subcounty, donated land to which others and the Anglican Church added to accommodate the current school campus. The first headmaster was Mesusera Kayongo, one of the founders.

Academics
Kako Senior Secondary School teaches the subjects commonly taught at O-Level and A-Level. In addition, the school teaches practical vocational subjects including computer science, metalworking, woodworking, carpentry, and nutrition. At the A-Level, both art and science are offered.

Prominent alumni
The following prominent people attended Kako Senior Secondary School:
 Salim Saleh - High-ranking Military Officer in the UPDF. Formerly, Uganda's Minister of State for Microfinance. Senior Adviser to the President of Uganda on military matters.
 Davis Kamoga - Bronze Medal winner in 400 meters at the 1996 Summer Olympics in Atlanta, Georgia
 Captain Frank Musisi - Commanding Officer for Headquarters & Headquarters Company, 377th Theater Sustainment Command, United States Army, New Orleans, Louisiana.

See also
 Education in Uganda
 Masaka District

References

External links
 Website of Kako Senior Secondary School
 Rankings of All Accredited Senior Secondary Schools In Uganda In 2009
   Uganda: Fundraisers a Waste of Time, Says Museveni
 Top Schools In Uganda: 2000 - 2010

Boarding schools in Uganda
Educational institutions established in 1963
Mixed schools in Uganda
Secondary schools in Uganda
1963 establishments in Uganda
Masaka District